Leptotarsus is a genus of true crane fly.

Species
Subgenus Aldrovandia Enderlein, 1912
L. gesneri (Enderlein, 1912)
Subgenus Araucomyia Alexander, 1929
L. brevihirsutus (Alexander, 1934)
L. paulseni (Philippi, 1866)
L. penitus (Alexander, 1944)
Subgenus Aurotipula Alexander, 1924
L. apertus (Edwards, 1923)
L. atroflavus (Alexander, 1922)
L. auroatrus (Edwards, 1923)
L. bivittatus (Edwards, 1923)
L. brevitarsis (Edwards, 1923)
L. clarus (Kirby, 1884)
L. dux (Kirby, 1884)
L. ferruginosus (Edwards, 1923)
L. flavoscapus (Alexander, 1922)
L. neali Oosterbroek, 1989
L. occlusus (Edwards, 1924)
L. orion (Hudson, 1895)
L. subtener (Alexander, 1922)
Subgenus Brevicera Miller, 1945
L. aenigmaticus (Alexander, 1926)
L. heterogamus (Hudson, 1913)
L. waitakerensis (Alexander, 1952)
Subgenus Ceoneura Alexander, 1924
L. idioneura (Alexander, 1924)
Subgenus Chlorotipula Alexander, 1924
L. albistigma (Edwards, 1923)
L. elongatus (Edwards, 1923)
L. holochlorus angustior (Alexander, 1923)
L. holochlorus holochlorus (Nowicki, 1875)
L. virescens (Edwards, 1923)
L. viridis (Walker, 1856)
Subgenus Habromastix Skuse, 1890
L. bulburinensis Dobrotworsky, 1974
L. cinerascens (Skuse, 1890)
L. cunninghamensis Dobrotworsky, 1974
L. heroni (Alexander, 1922)
L. hilli (Alexander, 1922)
L. luciae (Alexander, 1948)
L. novellus (Alexander, 1928)
L. ornatipes (Skuse, 1890)
L. parallelus (Alexander, 1920)
L. pergrandis (Alexander, 1922)
L. remotus (Walker, 1848)
L. similior (Alexander, 1923)
L. terraereginae (Alexander, 1920)
Subgenus Leptotarsus Guerin-Meneville, 1831
L. annulipes (Philippi, 1866)
L. ardrossanensis Dobrotworsky, 1972
L. clavatus (Macquart, 1850)
L. coolgardiensis Dobrotworsky, 1972
L. ducalis (Westwood, 1876)
L. esperanceiensis Dobrotworsky, 1972
L. fletcherensis Dobrotworsky, 1972
L. fraucai Dobrotworsky, 1972
L. imperatorius (Westwood, 1876)
L. kalamundaensis Dobrotworsky, 1972
L. macquartii Guerin-Meneville, 1831
L. regificus (Alexander, 1922)
L. scutellaris Skuse, 1890
L. subapterus Alexander, 1978
L. tricinctus (Walker, 1848)
L. trivittatus Skuse, 1890
Subgenus Leptotipula Alexander, 1917
L. edwardsianus (Alexander, 1920)
L. limnophiloides (Alexander, 1917)
Subgenus Limoniodes Alexander, 1938
L. sulphurellus (Alexander, 1938)
Subgenus Longurio Loew, 1869

L. africanus (Alexander, 1921)
L. albicubitalis (Alexander, 1964)
L. anoplostylus (Alexander, 1964)
L. aspropodus (Alexander, 1957)
L. atrirostris (Alexander, 1945)
L. basuticanus (Alexander, 1956)
L. belloides (Alexander, 1921)
L. bertii Alexander, 1979
L. bonaespei (Bergroth, 1888)
L. borgmeieranus Alexander, 1969
L. brasiliae (Alexander, 1935)
L. browni (Alexander, 1940)
L. bullocki (Alexander, 1931)
L. byersi Young and Gelhaus, 1992
L. caffer (Alexander, 1917)
L. caparaonus (Alexander, 1944)
L. capicola (Alexander, 1921)
L. carreranus (Alexander, 1945)
L. chaoianus (Alexander, 1949)
L. chionoides (Alexander, 1917)
L. chrysostigma (Alexander, 1944)
L. cinereilinea (Alexander, 1921)
L. cnephosus (Alexander, 1960)
L. congestus (Alexander, 1949)
L. coronatus (Alexander, 1917)
L. dolichoros (Wood, 1952)
L. drakensbergensis (Alexander, 1956)
L. eshowensis (Alexander, 1960)
L. espinozai (Alexander, 1939)
L. eucryptus (Alexander, 1953)
L. exemptus (Alexander, 1936)
L. flagellatus (Wood, 1952)
L. fulvus (Edwards, 1916)
L. ganocephalus (Alexander, 1960)
L. goyazanus (Alexander, 1940)
L. guimaraesi (Alexander, 1942)
L. gurneyi Alexander, 1975
L. gymnocerus (Alexander, 1938)
L. hainanensis (Alexander, 1936)
L. helotus Alexander, 1969
L. hirsutistylus (Alexander, 1949)
L. huanucensis (Alexander, 1954)
L. inaequipes (Alexander, 1956)
L. insidiosus (Alexander, 1949)
L. ixion (Alexander, 1949)
L. jonesi (Alexander, 1920)
L. lemniscatus (Alexander, 1929)
L. lustralis (Alexander, 1936)
L. luteiniger (Alexander, 1963)
L. luteistigma (Alexander, 1940)
L. macarius (Alexander, 1963)
L. melanopterus (Alexander, 1930)
L. micropteryx (Alexander, 1921)
L. millotianus (Alexander, 1958)
L. minimus (Alexander, 1914)
L. minusculoides (Wood, 1952)
L. minusculus (Alexander, 1917)
L. mitiformis (Alexander, 1960)
L. mossambicensis (Alexander, 1920)
L. mosselensis (Alexander, 1945)
L. nahuelbutae (Alexander, 1945)
L. neorinus (Alexander, 1953)
L. niphopodus (Alexander, 1956)
L. nocivus (Alexander, 1953)
L. paraguayanus (Riedel, 1921)
L. paraguayensis (Alexander, 1935)
L. perglabratus (Alexander, 1954)
L. phaedrus (Alexander, 1949)
L. piger (Alexander, 1945)
L. pruinosus (Johnson, 1913)
L. pulverosus (Matsumura, 1916)
L. pygmaeus (Alexander, 1914)
L. quadriniger (Alexander, 1949)
L. rabelloi (Alexander, 1954)
L. rhodesiae (Alexander, 1937)
L. riedelianus (Alexander, 1920)
L. rivertonensis (Johnson, 1909)
L. rubriceps (Edwards, 1916)
L. rubroniger (Alexander, 1921)
L. serotinellus (Alexander, 1928)
L. sessoris (Alexander, 1954)
L. silvester (Wood, 1952)
L. spinosus (Wood, 1952)
L. stenodiastema (Alexander, 1961)
L. stenostylus (Alexander, 1953)
L. stuckenbergi (Alexander, 1956)
L. styx (Alexander, 1954)
L. syndactylus (Alexander, 1956)
L. testaceus (Loew, 1869)
L. tijucanus (Alexander, 1943)
L. tinctorius (Alexander, 1960)
L. travassosanus (Alexander, 1942)
L. variceps (Alexander, 1935)
L. versfeldi (Wood, 1952)
L. vulsurus (Alexander, 1955)
L. yanoi Alexander, 1953
L. zeylanicus (Alexander, 1958)
L. zikanellus (Alexander, 1954)

Subgenus Macromastix Osten Sacken, 1887

L. albicollis (Alexander, 1924)
L. albipedis Hynes, 1993
L. albiplagius (Alexander, 1923)
L. alexanderi (Edwards, 1923)
L. alfie Theischinger, 1996
L. amissionis (Alexander, 1952)
L. angusticosta (Alexander, 1923)
L. arenarius (Alexander, 1950)
L. atridorsum (Alexander, 1922)
L. aurantioceps (Alexander, 1924)
L. barringtoniensis Dobrotworsky, 1974
L. binnaburrae (Alexander, 1951)
L. binotatus (Hutton, 1900)
L. brisbaneiensis Dobrotworsky, 1974
L. caledonianus (Alexander, 1934)
L. campbelli (Alexander, 1923)
L. cinereus (Edwards, 1923)
L. clitellarius (Alexander, 1930)
L. cockerellae (Alexander, 1929)
L. collessi Dobrotworsky, 1974
L. constrictus (Skuse, 1890)
L. costalis (Swederus, 1787)
L. cubitalis (Edwards, 1923)
L. decoratus (Edwards, 1923)
L. dichroithorax (Alexander, 1920)
L. dispar (Walker, 1835)
L. dorrigensis (Alexander, 1924)
L. errans (Edwards, 1927)
L. fergusoni (Alexander, 1924)
L. flavidipennis (Alexander, 1923)
L. fucatus (Hutton, 1900)
L. fumibasis (Edwards, 1923)
L. gargettensis Dobrotworsky, 1974
L. glabristylus Hynes, 1993
L. glaucocapillus (Alexander, 1952)
L. greyanus (Alexander, 1922)
L. hackeri (Alexander, 1920)
L. halteratus (Alexander, 1923)
L. helmsi (Skuse, 1890)
L. hudsonianus (Alexander, 1922)
L. humilis (Skuse, 1890)
L. huttoni (Edwards, 1923)
L. igniceps (Alexander, 1928)
L. incertus (Edwards, 1923)
L. intermedius (Alexander, 1922)
L. longioricornis (Alexander, 1923)
L. lunatus (Hutton, 1900)
L. luteicosta (Alexander, 1924)
L. luteisubcostatus (Alexander, 1934)
L. mastersi (Skuse, 1890)
L. mathewsi (Alexander, 1930)
L. mesocerus (Alexander, 1922)
L. minor (Edwards, 1923)
L. minutissimus (Alexander, 1923)
L. mixtus Hynes, 1993
L. monstratus (Alexander, 1924)
L. montanus (Hutton, 1900)
L. mutabilis (Alexander, 1928)
L. nigropolitus (Alexander, 1928)
L. noelianus Alexander, 1978
L. novocaledonicus (Alexander, 1929)
L. obliquus (Edwards, 1923)
L. obscuripennis (Kirby, 1884)
L. obscurirostris (Skuse, 1890)
L. ohakunensis (Alexander, 1923)
L. opifex (Alexander, 1929)
L. pallidistigma (Alexander, 1922)
L. pallidus (Hutton, 1900)
L. pedestris (Alexander, 1939)
L. pseudoaurantioceps Dobrotworsky, 1974
L. pseudotortilis Dobrotworsky, 1974
L. risbeci (Alexander, 1934)
L. rufibasis (Alexander, 1922)
L. rufiventris (Edwards, 1923)
L. sessilis (Alexander, 1924)
L. setivena (Alexander, 1929)
L. simillimus (Alexander, 1924)
L. sinclairi (Edwards, 1923)
L. spinastylus Hynes, 1993
L. submancus (Alexander, 1923)
L. submontanus (Edwards, 1923)
L. subobsoletus (Alexander, 1926)
L. subvittatus (Alexander, 1939)
L. tamborineiensis Dobrotworsky, 1974
L. tapleyi (Alexander, 1923)
L. tenuifrons (Alexander, 1926)
L. tortilis (Alexander, 1920)
L. variegatus (Edwards, 1923)
L. verreauxi (Alexander, 1929)
L. vittatus (Edwards, 1923)
L. vulpinus (Hutton, 1881)
L. zeylandiae (Alexander, 1920)

Subgenus Maoritipula Alexander, 1924
L. hudsoni (Alexander, 1924)
L. maori (Alexander, 1920)
Subgenus Pehlkea Enderlein, 1912
L. columbianus (Enderlein, 1912)
L. pallitarsis (Alexander, 1937)
L. regina (Alexander, 1914)
L. regulus (Alexander, 1943)
Subgenus Phymatopsis Skuse, 1890
L. albidipes (Alexander, 1929)
L. brevipalpis (Alexander, 1920)
L. brevirostratus (Alexander, 1922)
L. flavopygialis (Alexander, 1920)
L. intricatus (Alexander, 1928)
L. nigrirostris (Skuse, 1890)
L. nigrolimbatus (Alexander, 1929)
L. nigrosubcostatus (Alexander, 1924)
L. periplocus (Alexander, 1928)
L. tenuirostris (Alexander, 1924)
L. tonnoiranus (Alexander, 1928)
L. walpoleiensis Dobrotworsky, 1974
Subgenus Pseudoleptotarsus Alexander, 1920
L. liponeurus Alexander, 1920
L. nigrinus Dobrotworsky, 1972
Subgenus Tanypremna Osten Sacken, 1886
L. albobasalis Alexander, 1969
L. aurantiothorax (Alexander, 1954)
L. bezzianus (Alexander, 1921)
L. borgmeieri (Alexander, 1942)
L. calliope (Alexander, 1945)
L. carbonipes (Alexander, 1938)
L. cerritus (Alexander, 1945)
L. clotho (Alexander, 1944)
L. elegantior (Alexander, 1945)
L. fieldianus (Alexander, 1956)
L. fuscitarsis (Alexander, 1919)
L. guadeloupensis Young, 2001
L. hodgei (Alexander, 1939)
L. horridus (Alexander, 1941)
L. incompletus (Alexander, 1944)
L. invaripes (Alexander, 1936)
L. kadeni (Alexander, 1941)
L. longipes (Fabricius, 1805)
L. longissimus (Enderlein, 1912)
L. manicatus (Osten Sacken, 1888)
L. mirandus (Alexander, 1944)
L. opilio (Osten Sacken, 1886)
L. ornatipes (Alexander, 1941)
L. perornatus (Alexander, 1929)
L. phylax (Alexander, 1954)
L. picturellus (Alexander, 1941)
L. porterianus (Alexander, 1937)
L. proavitus (Alexander, 1940)
L. salome (Alexander, 1945)
L. saltatrix (Alexander, 1944)
L. sanctaecatharinae (Alexander, 1945)
L. uniguttatus (Alexander, 1954)
Subgenus Tanypremnella Alexander, 1938
L. antennifer (Alexander, 1942)
L. crystallinus (Alexander, 1938)
L. elongatus Alexander, 1978
L. gentilis (Alexander, 1943)
L. maldonadoi (Alexander, 1953)
L. mediocornis (Alexander, 1944)
L. megacerus (Alexander, 1943)
L. microcerus (Alexander, 1943)
L. perdistinctus (Alexander, 1942)
L. segnipes (Alexander, 1953)
L. transfasciatus (Alexander, 1938)
Subgenus Tanypremnodes Alexander, 1924
L. leucoplaca (Alexander, 1924)
L. subapicalis (Alexander, 1941)
Subgenus Xenotipula Alexander, 1921
L. cisatlanticus (Alexander, 1937)
L. munroi (Alexander, 1921)

References

Catalogue of the Craneflies of the World

Tipulidae